Faunsdale is a town in Marengo County, Alabama, United States. At the 2020 census the population was 90, down from 98 in 2010. Faunsdale is home to a community of Holdeman Mennonites, the such community outside of Greensboro, Alabama. The town has the only Holdeman Mennonite Church in the area, Cedarcrest Mennonite Church.

History
A post office called Faunsdale has been in operation since 1841. The town was named for nearby Faunsdale Plantation, named after a Roman god and owned since 1843 by Dr. Thomas Alexander Harrison. The town was named in his honor.

The plantation had been founded in the 1830s by Messrs Pearson and Henry Augustine Tayloe. The latter was also the local land agent for his older brothers Benjamin Ogle Tayloe, William Henry Tayloe, Edward Thornton Tayloe, and George Plater Tayloe, who all invested some of their great wealth in several plantations in this area. A 20th-century historian said they were "considered the most important pioneer cotton planters of the Canebrake, as to the extent of their enterprise there." 

Faunsdale was incorporated as a town in 1907.

Geography

Attractions
Every spring the town sponsors the annual Faunsdale Crawfish Festival, serving authentic Southern cooking on the street, with music and dancing.  The same week, the bi-annual Faunsdale Biker Rally is within walking distance.  It is an adult-only event, with bikers from all over the state in attendance.

A number of National Register of Historic Places-listed plantations are located a few miles from Faunsdale.  They include Battersea, Bermuda Hill, Cedar Crest, Cedar Grove Plantation, Cedar Haven, Cuba Plantation, Faunsdale Plantation, and Roseland Plantation.

Demographics

As of the census of 2000, there were 87 people, 34 households, and 24 families residing in the town. The racial makeup of the town was 42.98% White and 57.02% Black or African American. 4.60% of the population were Hispanic or Latino of any race.

There were 34 households, out of which 41.2% had children under the age of 18 living with them, 64.7% were married couples living together, 8.8% had a female householder with no husband present, and 26.5% were non-families. 20.6% of all households were made up of individuals, and 8.8% had someone living alone who was 65 years of age or older. The average household size was 2.56 and the average family size was 3.04.

In the town, the population was spread out, with 29.9% under the age of 18, 3.4% from 18 to 24, 28.7% from 25 to 44, 19.5% from 45 to 64, and 18.4% who were 65 years of age or older. The median age was 37 years. For every 100 females, there were 93.3 males. For every 100 females age 18 and over, there were 96.8 males.

The median income for a household in the town was $28,750, and the median income for a family was $50,417. Males had a median income of $30,833 versus $19,500 for females. The per capita income for the town was $14,697. There were no families and 3.2% of the population living below the poverty line, including no under eighteens and none of those over 64.

References

Towns in Marengo County, Alabama
Towns in Alabama